Miguel Primo de Rivera y Sáenz de Heredia, 2nd Duke of Primo de Rivera, 4th Marquess of Estella (11 July 1904 – 8 May 1964) was a Spanish aristocrat, lawyer, politician and diplomat. He was the second son of the dictator Miguel Primo de Rivera y Orbaneja and younger brother of the founder of the Falange Española, José Antonio Primo de Rivera.

He studied law at Universidad Central de Madrid and was called to the bar in Cádiz. Following World War II, he was Spanish Ambassador to the United Kingdom and mayor of Jerez de la Frontera (1947–1948). 

After his death, his nephew Miguel Primo de Rivera y Urquijo (son of his brother Fernando Primo de Rivera y Sáenz de Heredia) assumed the titles of duke and marquess.

References

External links
 

|-

1904 births
1964 deaths
People from San Sebastián
Ambassadors of Spain to the United Kingdom
FET y de las JONS politicians
Francoist Spain
Spanish Roman Catholics
Agriculture ministers of Spain
Civil governors of Madrid
Miguel
20th-century Spanish politicians